Clas Brede Bråthen (born November 28, 1968) is a Norwegian ski jumper who competed from 1986 to 1994. He won a silver medal in the team large hill event at the 1989 FIS Nordic World Ski Championships and finished 11th in the individual large hill at those same games.

Bråthen's best individual finish was third twice (1986, 1988).

External links

Norwegian male ski jumpers
1968 births
Living people
FIS Nordic World Ski Championships medalists in ski jumping
20th-century Norwegian people